The 1919 All-Ireland Senior Hurling Championship was the 33rd staging of the All-Ireland hurling championship since its establishment by the Gaelic Athletic Association in 1887. The championship began on 18 May 1919 and ended on 21 September 1919.

Limerick were the defending champions, however, they were defeated in the provincial championship. Cork won the title following a 6-4 to 2-4 defeat of Dublin in the final.

Teams

Team summaries

Results

Leinster Senior Hurling Championship

First round

Quarter-finals

Semi-final

Final

Munster Senior Hurling Championship

Quarter-finals

Semi-finals

Final

All-Ireland Senior Hurling Championship

Semi-final

Final

Championship statistics

Miscellaneous

 Cork's All-Ireland final victory is their first since 1903. It remains their longest interval between successive championship titles.

Sources

 Corry, Eoghan, The GAA Book of Lists (Hodder Headline Ireland, 2005).
 Donegan, Des, The Complete Handbook of Gaelic Games (DBA Publications Limited, 2005).

External links
 1919 All-Ireland Senior Hurling Championship results

References

1919